Damien Bridonneau (born April 19, 1975 in Niort, Deux-Sèvres) is a professional footballer currently playing for Ligue 2 club Vannes OC. He plays as a defender.

External links
Damien Bridonneau profile at chamoisfc79.fr

1975 births
Living people
People from Niort
French footballers
Association football defenders
Chamois Niortais F.C. players
Le Mans FC players
AS Saint-Étienne players
Vannes OC players
En Avant Guingamp players
SC Bastia players
FC Chauray players
Ligue 2 players
Sportspeople from Deux-Sèvres
Footballers from Nouvelle-Aquitaine